Abdulaziz Takrouni (born November 25, 1991), is a Saudi Arabian professional footballer who plays for Jeddah as a goalkeeper.

References

External links 
 

Living people
1991 births
Sportspeople from Jeddah
Saudi Arabian footballers
Ittihad FC players
Najran SC players
Al-Tai FC players
Al-Washm Club players
Al-Shoulla FC players
Khaleej FC players
Al-Ansar FC (Medina) players
Al-Kawkab FC players
Jeddah Club players
Saudi First Division League players
Saudi Professional League players
Saudi Second Division players
Association football goalkeepers